Boris Andreyev may refer to:
Boris Andreyev (cosmonaut) (born 1940), Soviet cosmonaut
Boris Andreyev (actor) (1915–1982), Soviet actor
Boris Andreyev (shooter) (1906–1987), Soviet Olympic shooter